The Fenix nickel project also known as El Estor mine is an integrated mountain-top nickel mine and processing facility near El Estor in the Izabal Department of eastern Guatemala. The project consists of a cluster of several deposits with reserves amounting to 36.1 million tonnes of ore grading 1.86% nickel. The project is owned by Solway Group through Guatemalan subsidiaries CGN (once called Eximbal) and Pronico.

The mine has contributed to over six decades of environmental conflict: initially implicated in violence during the Guatemalan civil war, and later becoming implicated in lawsuits and violence between 2009 and 2022. Local Mayan villagers say that the mine has polluted their water, damaged their crops, that they weren't properly consulted, and that they don't receive development benefits from the mine. The mining company and the government say that they follow all environmental laws, invest in local communities, and provide jobs.

A 2019 media investigation coordinated by French NGO Forbidden Stories found evidence in leaked documents that the mining company covered up pollution events, bribed community leaders to support the mine, and made payments to police and the military.

A protest in October 2021 resulted in a 30-day military enforced 'state of siege' in the area, raids on local homes and media outlets, and several arrests.

Background 
The Fenix project encompasses 250,000 square kilometers near the town of El Estor and adjacent to Guatemala's largest freshwater lake: Lake Izabal. The lake is an important breeding ground for endangered manatees. Local people rely on fish from the lake. The project area also includes protected areas and habitat for the endangered Yucatan black howler monkey.

The project  and includes about 20 Mayan villages, some of which have complained about water shortages and crop failures.

Nickel from the mine is primarily exported to China or Europe to manufacture stainless steel.

Initial mining rights in the area were granted by military leaders following the US-backed 1954 Guatemalan coup d'état. During the ensuing Guatemalan civil war, many Mayan people were massacred, and EXIMBAL mine security participated in this violence in 1978.

Ownership and production history 
The Fenix nickel resource was first developed in 1960 by the Canadian mining company Inco. The mine was explored by Guatemalan subsidiary Eximbal, and in 1965 the Guatemalan government granted the firm a 40-year lease to operate an open pit mine on 385 square kilometers.

From 1977 to 1980, the mine produced about 604,000 tonnes of saprolite ore annually, grading 2.12% nickel and yielded almost 15,000 tonnes of nickel. The operation was closed and placed on care and maintenance from 1980 to 2004.

Skye Resources, a Vancouver firm, purchased the project from Inco in 2004 but was acquired by Hudbay Minerals in 2008. At this time, the Eximbal subsidiary's name was changed to Compañía Guatemalteca de Niquel (CGN), which was 98.2% owned by Hudbay Minerals from August 2008 to September 2011, when it was sold for $170 million to the Russian owned Solway Group. Solway is now headquartered in Switzerland.  

After being dormant for decades, the project was reopened by Solway in 2014.

Solway subsidiary CGN does the mining, while the subsidiary Pronico operates the refinery.

Resources and facilities 
The Fenix Project in eastern Guatemala is a substantial brownfield nickel laterite mine and process plant.

In 2019 the Fenix mining concession covered 250,000 sq km.

Environmental conflict 
The project has resulted in multiple lawsuits and years of conflict with the local community. Local villagers say that they were not fairly consulted about the project, that their water and livelihoods have been threatened, and they do not receive development benefits from the project. The company says that it follows all environmental laws, has invested in the community and provides 1,900 jobs and additional contracted positions. The company insists that pollution in the lake is due to sewage and agriculture.

Residents in local communities also report attacks by mine security. Protests have been violently suppressed by police and the Guatemalan military, resulting in deaths.

2009 attacks and 2012 lawsuit 
In 2012, local peasants filed a lawsuit in Canada against HudBay Minerals and two of its subsidiaries over the killing of a prominent Mayan community leader at the Fenix Mining Project. The lawsuit alleges that on September 27, 2009, security personnel employed at the Fenix mine surrounded, beat and hacked at Adolfo Ich Chamán with machetes before shooting him in the head at close range in an unprovoked attack. According to the lawsuit, another man was crippled and a group of women were gang raped by mine security. 

A warrant was issued for the arrest of the head of mine security, Mynor Ronaldo Padilla Gonzáles in 2009, although he remained a fugitive and stayed on the company's payroll for several more years. He was convicted of homicide and on several counts of aggravated assault in 2021. A non-governmental organization said the murder was “targeted killing of a well-known community leader.”  Amnesty International has said that the murder allegations are "very serious, and Amnesty International calls for a swift, full and impartial investigation into the death of Adolfo Ich Chamán and other incidents of violence, to make the results public and to bring those responsible to justice”.

HudBay states that it and CGN have cooperated fully with all investigations conducted by Guatemalan authorities in connection with the incidents which occurred on September 27, 2009, in El Estor. CGN carried out an internal investigation and determined that none of its employees or security personnel were involved in the death of Chamán.

In June 2013, the Ontario Superior Court of Justice ruled that the Canadian company could be held legally responsible for crimes committed in Guatemala, including the alleged murder of Adolfo Ich Chamán and the alleged sexual assault of 11 women from Lote Ocho. A jury notice was filed in December 2013.

Evictions and land claims 
In late 2006 and early 2007, Skye Resources (acquired by HudBay Minerals in 2008, renamed HMI Nickel and subsequently sold by HudBay in 2011) sought forced evictions of Mayan communities located on contested mine land. Homes were burned to the ground during these evictions.

The Fenix mining project is also subject to ongoing land claims by local Mayan communities. In 2006, the International Labour Organization, an agency of the United Nations, ruled that Guatemala had breached international law by granting the Fenix mining concession without first consulting with local Mayan people. The ILO released a report discussing the violation in 2007.

In February 2022, the Inter-American Court of Human Rights heard a land-claims case from Mayan villagers impacted by the mine. The case is part of a years-long claim beginning in 2002, when area residents bought their land back from the Guatemalan government, but never received title.

Lake Izabal pollution incident (2017) 
In May 2017, the water in Lake Izabal turned red for a period of weeks, and local fishermen began protesting the mine. At least one protestor was shot and killed during these protests. The government blamed an algae bloom caused by sewage and denied connection to the mine, but local villagers blockaded the mine entrance and filed a lawsuit. In 2019, the court found that the Ministry of Energy and Mines (MEM) had failed to ensure local villagers' free, prior informed consent for the project, and that the mine had been operating since 2005 without local consent that is required by international labor law. The court ordered the suspension of operations at the mine. This ruling was overturned by the MEM in January 2022.

Forbidden stories investigation 
In 2019, a media investigation involving several outlets and coordinated by the French consortium Forbidden Stories found evidence of a smear campaign and suspicious economic payments that may have undermined the consultation process that followed the 2019 court ruling. It also found that local Mayan residents blamed the mine for failed crops and water pollution. Residents also said that although they had been promised schools and other development, they had not seen these benefits. Communities on land claimed by the mine expressed fears that they would be displaced, and reported catching deformed fish in Lake Izabal.

The investigation examined millions of leaked internal documents belonging to mining company Solway's Guatemalan subsidiary, and found that several pollution events were not reported, some of which could have led to criminal prosecution. They also found documentation of a massive discharge that occurred at the same time as the Lake Izabal pollution incident. Discharge from the mine at this time was reported by both the mining company and the government, and explicitly linked to the mine in the leaked documents. The investigation also found evidence of "troubling methods to exert influence over local politics and repress dissent.", including tens of thousands of dollars budgeted for bribery of community leaders. Local leaders report attempts at bribery and threats of violence for noncooperation with attempts to access nickel deposits under their towns. 

The company denied wrongdoing, and questioned the authenticity of the documents. The government said that laboratory testing attributed the pollution event to micro-alga, but has not made these studies public.

2021 protests 
In October 2021, protestors objecting to the allegedly rigged consultation blockaded the mine and the processing plant. After three weeks of blockades, on October 24, a confrontation where four police officers were wounded resulted in the government making an emergency declaration that restricted personal freedoms, imposed curfews, and deployed 1000 soldiers to El Estor (a community of 10,000). The soldiers arrested more than 60 protestors and raided over 40 homes.

Some local residents stated that they supported the emergency declaration and that the mine had brought development to the area.

See also 
 Mineral industry of Guatemala

References

External links and further reading
"Choc v. HudBay Minerals Inc. & Caal v. HudBay Minerals Inc. Lawsuits against Canadian company HudBay Minerals Inc. over human rights abuse in Guatemala"

Nickel mines in Guatemala
Environmental justice